Spanair Flight 5022 was a scheduled domestic passenger flight from Barcelona–El Prat Airport to Gran Canaria Airport, Spain, via Madrid–Barajas Airport that crashed just after take-off from runway 36L at Madrid Airport at 14:24 CEST (12:24 UTC) on 20 August 2008. The aircraft was a McDonnell Douglas MD-82, registration  Of the 172 passengers and crew on board, 154 died and 18 survived.

It was the only fatal accident for Spanair (part of the SAS Group) in the 25-year history of the company, and the 14th fatal accident and 24th hull loss involving the McDonnell Douglas MD-80 series aircraft. It was Spain's deadliest accident since the 1983 crash of Avianca Flight 011.

The accident further worsened Spanair's already negative image at the time and exacerbated its financial difficulties. Spanair subsequently ceased operations on 27 January 2012.

Flight and aircraft

The aircraft, named Sunbreeze (registration EC-HFP; constructor's number 53148), had been manufactured in late 1993 and was acquired by Spanair in July 1999.

There were 166 passengers and six crew members on board, including the 39-year-old captain, Antonio Garcia Luna, and the 31-year-old first officer, Francisco Javier Mulet.

Prior to the accident 
Fifty-nine minutes before the flight's second attempted take-off, the pilots had abandoned a departure because of excessive temperatures in the ram air temperature (RAT) probe. The aircraft was taken to a parking area where maintenance workers de-activated the RAT probe's heater. The aircraft was permitted to fly with an inoperable RAT probe heater because icing was not expected during the flight. Another takeoff was then attempted, during which the accident occurred.

Accident 
The accident occurred during the second attempt, at 14:24 local time, due to the pilot's failure to deploy the flaps and slats as required for takeoff. Without the use of these "high-lift" devices, the wings could not generate enough lift to keep the aircraft airborne. The MD-80 has a warning system (the take-off warning system or TOWS) that should have alerted the pilots that the aircraft was not correctly configured for take-off. However, the warning did not sound, and the pilots continued with the attempt. As the aircraft took off, it stalled and impacted the terrain right of the runway strip, disintegrating and bursting into flames.

Crash sequence 
Just 3 seconds after liftoff the aircraft started shaking and banking to both sides. The stall warning horn activated as well as the synthetic voice. The first officer called in interrogative tone an engine failure and reduced power on both engines, specially on the right one, increasing the bank angle on the right to 32 degrees, immediately after this, he pushed the engines to their full power and the pitch increased to 18 degrees. The aircraft impacted the ground just right of the runway with its tail section first, then its right wingtip and its right engine. The aircraft travelled on the ground, causing a few components to detach from the aircraft. The aircraft later lost contacted with ground when it jumped over an embankment. The landing gears and the engines detached from the aircraft and the plane continued sliding on the ground then colliding with another small embankment. In this impact the tail was torn off, the cockpit collapsed into the passenger area and the fuel leaked and ignited into a fireball. The aircraft engulfed in flames continued sliding on the ground until it reached De la Vega stream and collided with the riverbank. The fuselage was highly fragmented by the crash and had been damaged by the fire. The front third of the fuselage was on the stream bed, while the rear two-thirds were on the north side of the stream. The wings and the rear two-thirds of the fuselage were engulfed and destroyed by fire.

Victims

Of the 172 on board, 146 perished in the crash or immediately after in the fire, including both pilots. Of the twenty-six passengers and crew rescued alive from the crash site, six died before arriving at hospital, and two more died in hospital, bringing the total number of fatalities to 154.

Most of the deceased and 16 of the survivors were Spanish nationals. Nineteen of the deceased and two survivors were of other nationalities.

Among the victims, there were 15 victims of other nationalities including Germany, France, Mauritania, Turkey, Bulgaria, Gambia, Italy, Indonesia, and Brazil.

The crash threw some of the survivors clear of the wreckage and into a stream, lessening the severity of their burns. A 30-year-old woman with British and Spanish dual citizenship survived with a punctured lung and broken left arm but no burns, as she was thrown from row 6, still attached to her seat, into the stream.

Investigation

Summary

The accident was investigated by the Civil Aviation Accident and Incident Investigation Commission (CIAIAC). Representatives from the US National Transportation Safety Board, the aircraft manufacturer Boeing (as successor to McDonnell Douglas, the original aircraft manufacturer), and the engine manufacturer Pratt and Whitney supported the investigation.

A preliminary report on the accident was released by CIAIAC on 6 October 2008. Information extracted from the flight data recorder showed that the aircraft had taken off with flaps at 0°, and that the alarm for that abnormal takeoff configuration had not sounded. The report hinted at no other cause of the accident. Both the engines and thrust reversers were excluded as causes of the accident.

On 17 August 2009, CIAIAC released an interim report on the incident. The interim report confirmed the preliminary report's conclusion that the crash was caused by an attempt to take off with the flaps and slats retracted, which constituted an improper configuration, and noted that safeguards that should have prevented the crash failed to do so. The cockpit recordings revealed that the pilots omitted the "set and check the flap/slat lever and lights" item in the After Start checklist. In the Takeoff Imminent verification checklist the copilot had simply repeated the correct flap and slat position values without actually checking them, as shown by the physical evidence. All three safety barriers provided to avoid the takeoff in an inappropriate configuration were defeated: the configuration checklist, the confirm and verify checklist, and the Take-off Warning System (TOWS). The report also made a number of safety recommendations intended to prevent accidents like this from happening again.

CIAIAC published a further progress note in August 2010, and its final report in July 2011.

Theories

Fire or explosion
Some early eye-witness accounts suggested that the aircraft suffered an engine fire or explosion before crashing, but the Spanish airport authority AENA released a video showing that the engines neither exploded nor caught fire during take-off. Manuel Bautista, Director General of Spain's civil aviation authority, went as far as to state: "The engine is not the cause of the accident", surmising that a chain of events combining was more likely than a single cause.

Temperature sensor
There was considerable interest in the faulty air temperature probe (the RAT sensor, located on the front of the aircraft near the cockpit) that initially caused the pilot to turn the aircraft back for maintenance before the second takeoff attempt. The mechanic simply deactivated the probe because the aircraft's Minimum Equipment List allowed it to be left inoperative. On 22 August investigators interviewed the mechanic, who defended his action by saying that it had nothing to do with the crash. Spanair supported the mechanic's view that deactivation of the probe was an accepted procedure. Spanair stated that the problem detected on the first takeoff attempt was overheating caused by a temperature gauge's de-icing system, rather than a malfunction of the temperature gauge itself, and that since icing was not a risk on that flight, the de-icing system had been deactivated by the mechanic with the captain's approval.

On 11 May 2010, leaked details from the cockpit voice recorder (CVR) were released by Spanish media. The recording showed that both pilots were concerned about a repair job performed earlier on the day of the crash, in which mechanics used an ice pack to cool an overheating temperature sensor and removed a fuse. The BBC reported that the judge investigating the crash was to question three mechanics on suspicion of manslaughter. These were the head of maintenance for Spanair at Barajas and the two mechanics who checked the aircraft before take-off. On September 19, 2012, the criminal case against mechanic Felipe García and his supervisor, José Antonio Viñuela, who together faced 154 counts of involuntary manslaughter and 18 counts of injuries, was shelved, leaving the defunct airline to face civil charges.

Thrust reverser
Pictures of the wreckage showed one of the thrust reversers in the deployed position, and an early theory constructed in the media was that the thrust reverser of the No. 2 (right side) engine activated during the climb causing the aircraft to yaw suddenly to the right. This theory fell apart for three reasons: firstly, aircraft engineer Alberto Garcia pointed out that the MD-82 has tail-mounted engines positioned close to each other and to the aircraft's longitudinal axis, so that any yaw from asymmetric thrust would be small. Secondly, examination of the aircraft's maintenance logs showed that the thrust reverser on the right-side engine had been deactivated pending repair. It had been wired shut, and tape placed over the cockpit control to alert the crew. The MD-82 is permitted to fly with just one operable thrust reverser. Thirdly, the engine which had been pictured was the left engine, not the right one. The investigation concluded that the position of its thrust reverser was a result of the accident, not a cause of it.

Flaps and slats
El Mundo reported that the CVR showed that the pilot had said "Flaps OK, Slats OK" to the co-pilot. The article confirmed that the flaps had not been extended and that the alarm for that condition had not sounded. The final report concluded that the failure to deploy flaps was the cause of the accident.

The maintenance logbook of the aircraft has comments, two days before the crash, for an "autoslats failure" visual alarm occurring on slats extension; however autoslats are not used on takeoff, and it cannot be inferred that the slats system had a defect.

Flight mode
In an article published on 7 September, El Mundo suggested that during the flight preparation and takeoff attempts, the aircraft had some of its systems in flight mode rather than ground mode. Investigators noted that one particular ground-sensing relay (relay R2-5) was responsible for de-energizing the RAT probe heater when on the ground, and for inhibiting TOWS when in the air. They theorised that a fault in this relay could explain both the overheating of the probe and why the flaps and slats alarm had not sounded. When the R2-5 relay was recovered from the wreckage it was subjected to detailed examination. Two stuck contacts within the relay were identified, which would explain the overheating both on the day of the accident and the intermittent incidents recorded over the previous few days. That fault, however, would not have affected the operation of the TOWS system, and no fault was found that would have affected TOWS.

James W. Hudspeth, an investigator of a previous near accident (an MD-83, starting from Lanzarote) that was superficially similar, pointed out that the fuse of the so-called "left ground control relay" at position K-33 of the control panel might have been the actual culprit in the erroneous flight mode: Hudspeth found out during a 2-week investigation at Lanzarote that it is customary in normal maintenance routine to temporarily remove this circuit-breaker to engage flight mode, but the circuit-breaker is afterwards sometimes not replaced correctly. Because of the frequent handling of this circuit-breaker, it is also not easy to visually check that it is set properly. The CIAIAC team on the case of JK 5022 discounted this possibility because if the circuit-breaker had been left open it would also have affected the operation of the stall warning system, and the CVR recording showed that the stall warning system was functioning normally.

Malware
Spanish daily El País reported that, as revealed in an internal report issued by Spanair, malware which had infected the airline's central computer system used to monitor technical problems with its aircraft may have resulted in a failure to raise an alarm over multiple problems with the aircraft. A judge ordered the airline to provide all the computer system's logs from the days before and after the crash.

Final report
The CIAIAC published its final report into the accident on 26 July 2011.

It determined that the cause of the accident was:

 The crew lost control of the aircraft as a result of a stall immediately after takeoff, which was caused by an incorrect configuration for take-off (i.e. not deploying the flaps and slats, following a series of errors and omissions), coupled with the absence of any warning of the incorrect configuration.
 The crew did not recognise the indications of stall, and did not correct the situation after takeoff, and – by momentarily retarding the engine power and increasing the pitch angle – brought the aircraft closer to a stall condition.
 The crew did not detect the configuration error because they did not properly use the checklists to select and check the position of the flaps and slats during flight preparation, specifically:
 they failed to select the flaps/slats lever during the corresponding step in the "After Start" checklist;
 they did not cross-check the position of the lever and the state of the flaps/slats indicator lights during the "After Start" checklist;
 they omitted the flaps/slats check on the 'Take Off Briefing' (taxi) checklist;
 no visual inspection of the flaps and slats was carried out in execution of the "Final Items" step of the "Take Off Imminent" checklist.

The CIAIAC determined the following contributory factors:

 The absence of any warning of the incorrect take-off configuration because the TOWS did not work. It was not possible to determine conclusively why the TOWS system did not work.
 Inadequate crew resource management (CRM), which did not prevent the deviation from procedures and omissions in flight preparation.

In media

 "Deadly Delay", a 2016 episode of Mayday, covered the investigation into the crash.
 "Stalling on Takeoff", episode 33 of the Black Box Down podcast from Rooster Teeth, discussed the incident.
 "The Last Flight of the Sunbreeze", a Spanish documentary about the crash.

See also
 Northwest Airlines Flight 255 – Another MD-82 that crashed on take-off due to improper configuration
 Delta Air Lines Flight 1141 – 727 that crashed on take-off due to improper configuration
 List of aircraft accidents and incidents resulting in at least 50 fatalities

Notes

References

External links

Spanair Last Official Notice (Archive)
 Press release 1 (Archive), 20 August 2008
 Press release 2 (Archive), 20 August 2008
 Press release 3 (Archive)
Security camera video of the accident

Pre-crash photos of the airliner at airliners.net
Civil Aviation Accident and Incident Investigation Commission Progress Note A-032/2008 , August 2010
Civil Aviation Accident and Incident Investigation Commission Interim Report A-032/2008 , August 2009
Civil Aviation Accident and Incident Investigation Commission Safety Recommendation REC 0/19 , February 2009
Civil Aviation Accident and Incident Investigation Commission Preliminary Report A-32/2008 , October 2008
Civil Aviation Accident and Incident Investigation Commission Final Report A-032/2008 
Civil Aviation Accident and Incident Investigation Commission Final Report A-032/2008  

Aviation accidents and incidents in 2008
Aviation accidents and incidents in Spain
Transport in Madrid
Accidents and incidents involving the McDonnell Douglas MD-82
Airliner accidents and incidents caused by pilot error
Adolfo Suárez Madrid–Barajas Airport
2008 in Madrid
August 2008 events in Europe
Airliner accidents and incidents caused by stalls